Alexey Yuryevich Chernyak (born August 27, 1973, Almaty, Kazakh Soviet Socialist Republic) is a Russian political figure and a deputy of the 8th State Duma.

Education and career 
In 2018, Chernyak was granted a Doctor of Sciences degree in economics; he presented his thesis at the Baltic Academy of Tourism and Entrepreneurship. Chernyak has been engaged in politics since 1999 when he founded the youth public organization "Altamira" in Simferopol. In 2005–2011, he was the Chairman of the Crimean republican youth public organization "Union of Youth of the Regions of Ukraine". He was a member of the Party of Regions, and in 2006, he was elected as a deputy to the Verkhovna Rada of Crimea of the 5th convocation. From 2009 to 2010, he was the Deputy Minister for Youth Affairs, Family and Gender Policy of the Autonomous Republic of Crimea. In September 2014, he was appointed head of the Crimean Parliament's Committee on Health-Resort Complex and Tourism.

In 2014, Chernyak joined the United Russia. From 2014 to 2021, he was a deputy of the State Council of Crimea of the 1st and 2nd convocations. Since September 2021, he has served as a deputy of the 8th State Duma.

Awards 

 Order "For Merit to the Fatherland"

References

1973 births
Eighth convocation members of the State Duma (Russian Federation)
Living people
People from Almaty
United Russia politicians